Fawzi Hassan (born 23 January 1939) is an Egyptian boxer. He competed in the men's lightweight event at the 1964 Summer Olympics. At the 1964 Summer Olympics, he lost to Ronald Allen Harris of the United States.

References

1939 births
Living people
Egyptian male boxers
Olympic boxers of Egypt
Boxers at the 1964 Summer Olympics
Place of birth missing (living people)
Mediterranean Games medalists in boxing
Lightweight boxers
Mediterranean Games bronze medalists for Egypt
Competitors at the 1971 Mediterranean Games
20th-century Egyptian people
21st-century Egyptian people